Trevor Dunn's Trio-Convulsant is an avant-garde jazz trio led by Mr. Bungle bassist Trevor Dunn with guitarist Mary Halvorson and drummer Ches Smith.

AllMusic said the band combines "moody jazz with convulsive rock."

Discography 
 Debutantes & Centipedes (Buzz, 1998)
 Sister Phantom Owl Fish (Ipecac, 2004)

References

External links 
 Trevor Dunn at Ipecac
 
 
 

American experimental musical groups
Avant-garde jazz ensembles
Ipecac Recordings artists
American jazz ensembles from California